Mikołajewo may refer to the following places:
Mikołajewo, Czarnków-Trzcianka County in Greater Poland Voivodeship (west-central Poland)
Mikołajewo, Masovian Voivodeship (east-central Poland)
Mikołajewo, Podlaskie Voivodeship (north-east Poland)
Mikołajewo, Wągrowiec County in Greater Poland Voivodeship (west-central Poland)
Mikołajewo, Warmian-Masurian Voivodeship (north Poland)